Cristian Fatecha (born 15 March 1982) is a Paraguayan footballer.

He is the brother of javelin thrower Víctor Fatecha.

Fatecha represented Paraguay U20, finishing in Third place at the 2001 South American U-20 Championship and Fourth place at the 2001 FIFA World Youth Championship. Fatecha went on to make two appearances at full international level during the qualifiers for the 2006 FIFA World Cup.

Club career
Fatecha participated in the preliminary phase of the 2007 Copa Sudamericana, scoring against Danubio on 1 August and scoring one of Tacuary's four penalties after a 2:2 aggregate draw on 15 August.

International career
Fatecha made 12 appearances for Paraguay U20, participating in both the 2001 South American U-20 Championship, and scoring one goal against Chile, and the 2001 FIFA World Youth Championship.

In 2005, Fatecha made two appearances for the Albirroja during the qualifiers for the 2006 FIFA World Cup. His first appearance came against Venezuela on 8 October in a 1−0 away victory. Fatecha was in the starting line up of the squad which featured Roque Santa Cruz and Nelson Haedo. Four days later, Fatecha made his second appearance for the Albirroja in a 1−0 home defeat against Colombia on 12 October. Fatecha played a full 90 minutes of the fixture as he was partnered in attack with Nelson Cuevas and Salvador Cabañas.

References

External links
 
 

1982 births
Living people
Paraguayan footballers
Association football forwards
Paraguay international footballers
Paraguay under-20 international footballers
Paraguayan expatriate footballers
Sportivo Luqueño players
Club Tacuary footballers
Juventud de Las Piedras players
12 de Octubre Football Club players
Expatriate footballers in Uruguay